The Friendly Sons of the Shillelagh is an Irish-American fraternal organization founded in 1964 by Jack Dunphy and Harry Knox, initially to get an Irish group from Old Bridge, New Jersey to march in the Newark, New Jersey Saint Patrick's Day parade.

Functions
The FSOS counts several hundred members in its Old Bridge chapter alone. The club has since expanded to chapters in Belmar, New Jersey, West Orange, New Jersey, and Ocean County, NJ.  Its pipe and drum band has competed internationally and has won awards in the United States, Ireland, and Scotland. The group also makes its largest showing at the Belmar, New Jersey Saint Patrick's Day parade every year.

External links
 
 The Friendly Sons of the Shillelagh - Essex Division home page

Ethnic fraternal orders in the United States
Irish-American culture in New Jersey
1964 establishments in New Jersey